The Waterloo Medal was a campaign medal of the Duchy of Brunswick. The medal was awarded to troops and officers from Brunswick who participated in the Battles of Quatre Bras and Waterloo.

Appearance
The medal is round and made of bronze from captured French cannons, medals for officers were gilded. The obverse depicts, in a left facing profile, the fallen Duke of Brunswick, Frederick William. Around the edge is the inscription, in German Script, FRIEDRICH WILHELM HERZOG. The reverse of the medal bears the date 1815 in the centre, surrounded by a wreath of oak and laurels. Around the outside of the wreath is the inscription, Braunschweig Seinen Kriegern (Brunswick to her Warriors) above, and Quatrebras und Waterloo below.

Other Waterloo Medals
Five nations of Seventh Coalition struck medals for soldiers who took part in the campaign:
 This medal for the troops of Brunswick
 Waterloo Medal for British and King's German Legion troops
 Hanoverian Waterloo Medal
 Nassau Waterloo Medal
 Prussian Waterloo Medal

References 

Orders, decorations, and medals of the Duchy of Brunswick
19th-century establishments in the Duchy of Brunswick
Battle of Waterloo
German campaign medals
Awards established in 1818